Bida (Chimini: Bidda, Somali: Biida) or Bido are a clan confederacy based in Baraawe, South West State of Somalia and make up one of the groups part of the "todobo Tol" (roughly translates to 7 clans) also known as Bravanese people. Member clans of this clan umbrella can also be found in other confederacies further up the coast in Marka and Mogadishu.

Overview 

Biida which translates to "settled" in Chimini is a clan confederacy now made up of 10 clans, where each clan came in different historical periods and joined over the course of the last millennia. The original members of this confederacies belonged to the Wa'ili, Amwawi, Jabri, Qahtani and other tribes from mainly southern Arabia. These Arabic names can still be found on the nisbas of the local families however in the course of times these names have changed locally, hence Wa'ili are called Ra Waali, Amwawi are called Ra Ma'limu, Jabri are called Gabra/Gabro and the Qahtani are called Reer Faqi. Any new arrivals from Arabia could potentially be included under this confederacy/umbrella after they had settled in Baraawe for some time and they gave official allegiance to the confederation.

Geography 
Members of the Biida confederacy can be found all over southern Somalia's major cities such as Mogadishu, Marka, Afgooye, Jilib, Buale, Baidoa, Bardheere and Diinsoor. Some of the member clans under the Biida umbrella can also be found in other confederacy of clans further up the coast in Marka and Mogadishu, such as the reer Faqi's and the Shanshiyo's. Members of the Biidah umbrella clans can also be found in both Zanzibar and Kenya, especially in coastal settlements such as Lamu, Malindi and Mombasa (most had moved to these areas after the war).

Clan Tree 

 Biido
 Ra Waali
 Ra Ma'limu
 Gabro
 Ra Mashaanga
 Reer Faqi
Ra Shaqali (Ra Baqtiile, Ra Duressa)
 Cabdi Shuqaale 
 Ra Bakari (Ra Nurshe, Ra Raabe, Ra Banawari)
 Ba Sadiq
 Raa Mkaawu
 Zimarka
Ra Mgumi

Notable people

Traditional elders and religious leaders 

ʿAbd al-ʿAzīz Al-Amawī Al-Barawi
 Muḥyī al-Dīn al-Qaḥṭānī Al-Wa'ili Al-Barawi
Qasim Muḥyī al-Dīn Al-Wa'ili Al-Barawi

Politics 
 Jeilani Sheikh Bin Sheikh 
 Ahmed Ada Munie 
 Mohamed Jeilani Sheikh 
 Ali Bobo Faqi 
 Bur’i Hamza 
 Maryam Qasim
 [ Hamza Said Hamza ]
 Intellectuals and Professionals
 Dr Ali Mungana Maye, a senior urology surgeon, who was one of the few specialists before the start of civil war.
 Dr Maye Abu Omar, University Professor and international consultant in Health. Former senior civil servant at the Ministry of Health prior to civil war 
 Dr Abubakar Mohamed Buho, was specialist of neuro-psychiatry. The only one on Somalia until the beginning of civil

See also 

Haatim
Asharaf
Bravanese people
 Benadiri people
 Tunni

References 

Ethnic groups in Somalia